Emanuel Šakić (born 25 January 1991) is an Austrian professional footballer who plays as a right-back for Super League Greece club Ionikos.

Career
On 3 January 2018, Šakić joined Greek Superleague club Atromitos on a one-and-a-half-year contract. On 9 December 2018, he scored his first goal for the club, opening the score in an emphatic 4–2 home win against Aris.

He then joined Sturm Graz and in the summer of 2020, he signed a contract with Aris on a free transfer.

Career statistics

References

External links

1991 births
Living people
Austrian footballers
Austria youth international footballers
Austrian expatriate footballers
SC Austria Lustenau players
Floridsdorfer AC players
SC Rheindorf Altach players
Atromitos F.C. players
SK Sturm Graz players
Aris Thessaloniki F.C. players
Ionikos F.C. players
2. Liga (Austria) players
Austrian Football Bundesliga players
Super League Greece players
Expatriate footballers in Greece
Austrian expatriate sportspeople in Greece
Footballers from Vienna
Association football defenders